A gabbai, also known as shamash (sometimes spelled shamas) or warden (UK, similar to churchwarden) is a beadle or sexton, a person who assists in the running of synagogue services in some way. The role may be undertaken on a voluntary or paid basis. A shamash (literally 'servant') or gabbai can also mean an assistant to a rabbi (particularly the secretary or personal assistant to a Hasidic rebbe).

In ma'amad,  the Council of Elders (or "the board of directors") of the communities of Sephardi Jews, the position of gabbai was that of the treasurer.

Etymology
The word gabbai is Hebrew and, in Talmudic times, meant "collector of taxes or charity" or "treasurer".

The term shamash is sometimes used for the gabbai, the caretaker or "man of all work" in a synagogue.

Duties

While the specific set of duties vary from synagogue to synagogue, a gabbai's responsibilities will typically include ensuring that the religious services run smoothly.

The gabbai may be responsible for calling congregants up to the Torah. In some synagogues, the gabbai stands next to the Torah reader, holding a version of the text with vowels and trope markings (which are not present in the actual Torah scroll), following along in order to correct the reader if the reader makes an error. In other synagogues, these responsibilities are instead that of a sgan.

A gabbai might manage some of the financial affairs of the institution, such as collection of contributions and keeping financial records. The administrator of charitable funds might be called the gabbai tzedakah.

A gabbai's responsibilities might also include maintaining a Jewish cemetery.

Dress
In some parts of the world, the gabbaim wear special clothing. In Anglo-Jewry, for example, gabbaim in some synagogue movements have traditionally worn top hats, and where there is a shamash, he may wear canonicals.

In popular culture
An example from literature is "Moshe the Beadle", a character in Night by Elie Wiesel.

References

Further reading
 Yad LaTorah:  Laws and Customs of the Torah Service - A Guide for Gabba'im and Torah Readers by Kenneth Goldrich, published by the United Synagogue of Conservative Judaism and the Rabbinical Assembly.  

Jewish religious occupations In Sephardic traditions, a gabbai would collect money from the rich and distribute it to the poor as part of the services of the synagogue. 
Religious leadership roles
Titles
Aramaic words and phrases
Aramaic words and phrases in Jewish prayers and blessings